Andrew James Garrett (born 1961) is a professor of linguistics at the University of California, Berkeley.

He specializes in Indo-European languages, and the languages of California, especially Yurok.

Garrett received his Ph.D. in linguistics from Harvard University in 1990, with a dissertation entitled The Syntax of Anatolian Pronominal Clitics. He is a fellow of the Linguistic Society of America.

In collaboration with Leanne Hinton, Garrett has worked on a project to digitize many of the Survey of California and Other Indian Languages records, which are now available through the California Language Archive.

Bibliography
 Andrew Garrett, Melissa Stoner, Susan Edwards, Jeffrey MacKie-Mason, Nicole Myers-Lim, Benjamin W. Porter, Elaine C. Tennant, and Verna Bowie, Native American collections in archives, libraries, and museums at the University of California, Berkeley (Office of the Vice Chancellor for Research, UC Berkeley, 2019; also available in print at cost via lulu.com)
 Basic Yurok (Berkeley: Survey of California and Other Indian Languages, 2014)
 Dianne Jonas, John Whitman, and Andrew Garrett, eds., Grammatical change: Origins, nature, outcomes (Oxford: Oxford University Press, 2012)
 Lisa Conathan, Andrew Garrett, and Juliette Blevins, compilers, Preliminary Yurok dictionary (Berkeley: Yurok Language Project, Department of Linguistics, UC Berkeley, 2005)

References 

1961 births
Fellows of the Linguistic Society of America
Harvard Graduate School of Arts and Sciences alumni
Linguists from the United States
Living people
University of California, Berkeley College of Letters and Science faculty